The Norfork Tailwater is the segment of the North Fork River below Norfork Dam in north central Arkansas. The community of Salesville lies approximately 1.5 miles west of the dam on Arkansas Highway 177. Norfork is located on Arkansas Highway 5 at the confluence of the Norfork Tailwater with the White River approximately 3.5 miles southwest of the dam.

The Norfork Tailwater is home to brown, rainbow, cutthroat, and brook trout, as well as other fish. A trout hatchery (the Norfork National Fish Hatchery) near Quarry Park keeps the tailwater stocked with trout, while the dam's cold water output provides suitable habitat for these cool-water game fish.

2008 flood
In response to the Spring 2008 Midwest floods the Army Corps of Engineers opened the dam floodgates on April 10.

References

Rivers of Arkansas
Rivers of Baxter County, Arkansas